Korina Legaki is a Greek singer born in Herakleion, Crete, of Greek-Swedish origin. She trained in classical and jazz singing, piano and orthophony, and participated in Spyros Sakkas's Vocal Art Workshop. A multilingual and multicultural persona, she has recorded five solo records with original material as well as covers of Greek and foreign composers. She has recorded and performed with musicians, composers, singers and ensembles across several genres from free jazz to traditional and from academic to ethnic. She has sung in theaters, concert halls and various venues throughout Greece and abroad, including the Odeon of Herodes Atticus, the Athens Concert Hall, the Zappeion, the temple of Poseidon in Sounio, the Anglican Church of St. Paul's and the European Parliament. At the same time, she has undertaken significant volunteering work, joining forces on stage and in studios with refugee children.

Her latest solo album, Neos Kosmos (2019), features new songs by composers Giorgos Andreou and Nikos Xydakis, and lyrics by Giorgos Andreou, Thodoris Gonis, Kiki Dimoula, Manos Eleftheriou and Dionysis Kapsalis. Korina is also the main performer of composer Giorgos Andreou's upcoming record, which puts to music some important contemporary and classical poetry and prose.

Discography

Solo albums 
2019: NEOS KOSMOS – twelve new songs with music by composers Giorgos Andreou and Nikos Xydakis, and lyrics by Giorgos Andreou, Thodoris Gonis, Kiki Dimoula, Manos Eleftheriou and Dionysis Kapsalis.

2015: MOSAIC – covers of important, though lesser known, gems of Greek and international music from the 50s to the present day. Music by Stamatis Kraounakis, Nikos Xydakis, Giorgos Andreou, Giorgos Kazantzis, Manolis Hiotis, Christos Nikolopoulos et al. Lyrics by Mihalis Ganas, Lina Nikolakopoulou, Thodoris Gonis, Manolis Rasoulis, Odysseas Ioannou et al. Production-arrangement-supervision: Giorgos Andreou.

2014: KYMATOGRAPHOS – twelve cinema songs by Eden Abhez, Antônio Pinto, Mikis Theodorakis, Eleni Karaindrou, Astor Piazzolla, Nicola Piovani, Zbigniew Preisner et al. in collaboration with guitar virtuoso Panagiotis Margaris.

2012: ΤΑΓΚΟ ΓΙΑ ΤΡΕΙΣ [TANGO FOR THREE] – music by Dimitris Maramis, lyrics by Mihalis Ganas, K.G. Karyotakis and Maria Polydouri.

2010: ΧΟΡΟΣ ΜΕ ΤΗ ΒΡΟΧΗ [A DANCE WITH THE RAIN] – music by Armos, Dimitris Maramis, Stergios Gargalas; lyrics by Kostas Bournazakis, Sotiris Trivizas et al.

Guest appearances 
2021: ΣΥΝΝΕΦΑ ΠΑΝΤΟΥ [CLOUDS EVERYWHERE] – Giannis Mitsis. Guest appearance on the songs "I psihes mas tha'ne panta edo", "Mera mesimeri" and "Tha xanantamosoume". Lyrics and music by Giannis Mitsis and Nomik.

2020: ΒΡΑΔΥ [EVENING]  – Single release. Duet with Eleni Tsaligopoulou. Poem by K. G. Karyotakis and music by Lena Platonos.

2019: ΠΑΤΗΜΑΣΙΕΣ ΣΤΟ ΧΙΟΝΙ [FOOTSTEPS ON THE SNOW] – George Hadjipieris. Guest appearance on the song "Tris hiononifades". Lyrics and music by George Hadjipieris.

2019: 16 ΓΑΜΟΙ ΓΙΑ ΜΙΑΝ ΑΓΑΠΗ [16 WEDDINGS FOR A LOVE AFFAIR] – Guest appearance on the song "Xodepsa thalasses". Lyrics by Ioanna Kolliniati and music by Nikos Xydakis.

2015: ΠΟΙΟΣ ΜΟΥ ΧΑΛΑΣΕ ΤΟ ΤΡΑΙΝΟ; [WHO BROKE MY TRAIN?] – Guest appearance on the songs "To matiasma", "Panselinos", "Pios mou halase to treno?", "To patari", "Fouskes" and "Plastelini. Lyrics by Paraskevas Karasoulos and Giannis Vasilopoulos and music by Giorgos Andreou.

2007: ΑΝΕΜΟΙ ΚΑΙ ΠΑΛΙΡΡΟΙΕΣ [WINDS AND TIDES] – Guest appearance on the song "Metanastis" together with Babis Stokas and Armos band. Lyrics by Kostas Bournazakis and music by Armos band.

Live acts 
 February 2020: Tango goes Symphony at the Olympia-'Maria Callas' Municipal Music Theatre with the Tangarto Quintet and the Athens Symphony Orchestra. Themed concert dedicated to Argentine Tango and the work of Astor Piazzolla.
November 2019-January 2020: Let's go to... Orient Express at the Railway-Carriage Theater ‘To Treno sto Rouf’. Concerts under the artistic direction of Margarita Mytilinaiou.
 
 Summer 2019: Tour throughout Greece with the composer Giorgos Andreou as well as with her solo act. Ancient Livithra, Zappeion, Roman Agora in Athens et al. On July 10, 2019, she performed alongside Maria Farantouri in the Odeon of Herod Atticus as part of the Athens-Epidaurus Festival.
 
 Spring 2019: Presentation concerts of her upcoming album with her new band under the artistic direction of Margarita Mytilinaiou. Half Note Jazz Club and tour.
 
 February 2019: Athens Concert Hall, National Bank of Greece Cultural Foundation 50th Anniversary Concert.
 
 December 2018: Christmas themed concert in St. Paul's Anglican Church in Athens, together with refugee children.
 
 November 2018: World cinema-themed concert in the European Parliament in Brussels; invited by MEP Giorgos Grammatikakis.
 
 Summer 2018: Concerts with Giorgos Andreou in the emblematic Temple of Poseidon in Sounio and the Zappeion in Athens.
 
 Spring 2017: Tour throughout Greece with composers Giorgos Andreou and Giorgos Kazantzis until summer 2018. Venues such as: Polis Stage, Thessaloniki Concert Hall etc.
 
 Winter 2017: Karolou Diehl and Tsimiski. Music by Giorgos Andreou, Lyrics and Book by Thodoris Gonis. Sings alongside Eleni Tsaligopoulou, Giota Nega and Eleni Kokkidou in Athens and on tour.
 
 Winter 2016-17: Presentation concerts of her record Mosaic with her own band in the Athenaeum Cellar and on tour.
 
 Winter 2016: Interprets Logbook III, with music by Giorgos Andreou on the poetry collection of the same name by Nobel Prize Laureate Giorgos Seferis (59th International Philippi Festival).
 
 Winter 2015-16: Main singer in the joint appearance of Nikos Xydakis and Giorgos Andreou in Athens (Tzeni Karezi Theatre) and on tour.
 
 Summer 2015: Tours Greece and Cyprus with Giorgos Andreou, TaniaTsanaklidou and Rita Antonopoulou.

References 

Living people
Year of birth missing (living people)
Greek people of Swedish descent
21st-century Greek women singers
Musicians from Heraklion
Greek jazz singers
Greek pianists
21st-century women pianists